Acmispon argophyllus, synonym Lotus argophyllus, is a species of legume native to California and northwest Mexico. It is known by the common name silver bird's-foot trefoil or silver lotus.

It is native to northwest Mexico and California, where it can be found in the southern California Coast Ranges, Peninsular Ranges, and Transverse Ranges, the Sierra Nevada, Southern California coastal zones, and the Channel Islands. It is found on sheltered rocky slopes in chaparral, conifer forest, and other habitat types.

Description
Acmispon argophyllus is a perennial herb growing prostrate to erect, the base of its stem woody and tough and upper parts coat in silky silvery hairs. The leaves are each made up of pairs of hairy oval leaflike leaflets around a centimeter long.

The inflorescence is a cluster of many tubular yellow flowers each about a centimeter long, encased at the base in a calyx of silky-hairy sepals. The fruit is legume pod generally containing a single seed.

Varieties
The varieties of this species include:
A. a. var. adsurgens — San Clemente Island bird's-foot trefoil is endemic to San Clemente Island, one of the Channel Islands of California. It is rare.
A. a. var. argenteus — Channel Islands silver lotus is endemic to several of the Channel Islands.
A. a. var. argophyllus — Fremont's silver lotus is a more common variety which can be found in mainland distribution.
A. a. var. fremontii is known only from the Sierra Nevada.
A. a. var. niveus — Santa Cruz Island bird's-foot trefoil,  endemic to Santa Cruz Island, another of the Channel Islands, is rare.
A. a. var. ornithopus — Guadalupe bird's-foot trefoil, endemic to Guadalupe Island in Baja California, and is sometimes lumped into var. argenteus.

See also
California chaparral and woodlands

References

External links

Jepson Manual Treatment — Lotus argophyllus
USDA Plants Profile
Lotus argophyllus Photo gallery

argophyllus
Flora of California
Flora of Baja California
Acmispon argophyllus var. ornithopus
Flora of Northwestern Mexico
Flora of the Sierra Nevada (United States)
Natural history of the California chaparral and woodlands
Natural history of the California Coast Ranges
Natural history of the Channel Islands of California
Natural history of the Peninsular Ranges
Natural history of the Santa Monica Mountains
Natural history of the Transverse Ranges
Taxa named by Asa Gray
Flora without expected TNC conservation status